Heroes of the Hills is a 1938 American Western "Three Mesquiteers" B-movie directed by George Sherman.

Cast
 Robert Livingston as Stony Brooke
 Ray Corrigan as Tucson Smith
 Max Terhune as Lullaby Joslin
 Priscilla Lawson as Madeline Reynolds
 LeRoy Mason as Red
 James Eagles as The Kid
 Roy Barcroft as Robert Beaton
 Barry Hays as Beaton's cohort
 Carleton Young as Connors
 Forrest Taylor as Sheriff
 John P. Wade as Board chairman (as John Wade)
 Maston Williams as Convict

References

External links
 

1938 films
1938 Western (genre) films
American Western (genre) films
1930s English-language films
American black-and-white films
Films directed by George Sherman
Republic Pictures films
Three Mesquiteers films
1930s American films